Gerald Valgora (/jeɪ væl-gɔr-a/;) also known as Jay Valgora, is an American architect, architectural theorist, and urbanist.  He is the founder and principal of the architectural design firm Studio V.

Early Life and Education 
Jay Valgora grew up in Buffalo, New York. The steel mills where his father worked and the historic grain elevators of Buffalo influenced Valgora to become an architect.
Valgora studied architecture at Cornell University (BArch), Harvard Graduate School of Design (MArch) and was a Fellow in the Fulbright Program to the United Kingdom.  At Harvard, Valgora studied under Pritzker Prize-winning Portuguese architect Alvaro Siza Vieira.

In London, Valgora commenced his investigations into industrial waterfronts, continuing with a Fulbright Fellowship.

Career 
In 1993, Valgora became design director of Rockwell Group, leading designs for the Cirque du Soleil theater, the Dolby Theatre (then known as the Kodak Theatre), the first W Hotel, and Mohegan Sun. Starting in 1998, as design principal of WalkerGroup, Valgora designed buildings in the United States, Spain, and Japan and began his investigations into combining contemporary design with historic and industrial architecture.

In 2000, Valgora established V Studio, a design studio. In 2000, Valgora designed the Iwataya Passage in Fukuoka Japan, and designed the set for Double Exposure, a multi-media dance production by Alvin Ailey American Dance Theater that premiered at Lincoln Center, New York.

This practice formed the basis for founding Studio V Architecture in 2006. He began to focus on the redesign of industrial waterfronts to transform former industrial sites.

Design philosophy 
Valgora’s design methodology focuses on critical inquiry engaging contemporary form with historic structures. Architectural examples include the J + K Residence (contemporary townhouse inserted on top of an historic hotel), Bronx Post Office, Macy’s Herald Square (historic fabric contrasting contemporary fabrication) and Hunts Point train station, originally designed by Cass Gilbert. Valgora’s designs have also juxtaposed different uses for a single structure, as seen in his design for Frank 57, which includes a hospital, three types of residences (luxury, affordable, and co-living), and retail.

Valgora’s designs for the Empire Stores addresses many of his design principles  within a single project, combining historic and contemporary architecture. His project  “Silo City,” which transformed the grain elevators in Buffalo, NY into an arts and cultural center, features art galleries mixed with velodromes, residences and community gardens.

His design for the abandoned Michigan railway bridge spanning the Niagara Gorge between the US and Canada proposed converting the bridge into an elevated public park, hotel, and museum. 

His design for Iwataya Passage in Fukuoka, Japan features an reinterpreted underground public street with illuminated glass and cable structures connecting train stations, hotel, and stores. Valgora’s Flushing River master plan envisioned a new waterfront community with elevated esplanades and parks.

Valgora’s design for the adaptive reuse of oil tanks at Maker Park / The Tanks was also the subject of debate on the adaptive reuse of industrial structures.

Notable works

Architecture 

 Empire Stores, Dumbo, Brooklyn, NY
 Iwataya Passage, Fukuoka, Japan
 Yonkers Raceway Expansion, Yonkers, NY
 Macy’s Herald Square, New York City

Urban Design 

 Industry City master plan (Bush Terminal), Sunset Park, NY
 Seaside, Queens master plan, the Rockaways, NY
 Anable Basin, original master plan Long Island City, NY
 Flushing River masterplan, Flushing, NY
 Stamford Transportation Center, Stamford, CT

Interior Design 

 50 Murray, New York City, interior design

References 

20th-century American architects
21st-century American architects
Cornell University College of Architecture, Art, and Planning alumni
Harvard Graduate School of Design alumni
Year of birth missing (living people)
Living people